Matěj Chaluš (born 2 February 1998) is a Czech professional footballer who players as a centre-back for Dutch club FC Groningen on loan from Allsvenskan club Malmö FF.

Career
He made his senior league debut for Příbram on 28 November 2015 in a Czech First League 2–1 away loss at Slavia Prague.

Slavia
In June 2016, after Příbram was relegated to the Czech National Football League, he signed for Slavia Prague for an undisclosed fee. He immediately went on loan to Mladá Boleslav. The loan was supposed to be two seasons long with Slavia retaining the possibility to recall him after one year.

In February 2019, he returned to Příbram on loan until the end of the season.

Honours 
Malmö FF

 Svenska Cupen: 2021–22

References

External links 
 
 
 Matěj Chaluš official international statistics
 
 Matěj Chaluš profile on the 1. FK Příbram official website

Czech footballers
1998 births
Living people
Czech First League players
Allsvenskan players
1. FK Příbram players
SK Slavia Prague players
FK Mladá Boleslav players
FC Slovan Liberec players
Malmö FF players
Association football central defenders
Czech Republic youth international footballers
Czech Republic under-21 international footballers
Czech expatriate footballers
Expatriate footballers in Sweden
Czech expatriate sportspeople in Sweden
FC Groningen players
Expatriate footballers in the Netherlands
Czech expatriate sportspeople in the Netherlands